Melvin Mouron Belli (July 29, 1907 – July 9, 1996) was a prominent United States lawyer, writer, and actor known as "The King of Torts" and by insurance companies as "Melvin Bellicose". He had many celebrity clients, including Zsa Zsa Gabor, Errol Flynn, Chuck Berry, Muhammad Ali, The Rolling Stones, Jim Bakker and Tammy Faye Bakker, Martha Mitchell, Maureen Connolly, Lana Turner, Tony Curtis, and Mae West. During his legal career, he won over $600 million in damages for his clients. He was also the attorney for Jack Ruby, who shot Lee Harvey Oswald days after the assassination of President John F. Kennedy.

Early life
Belli was born in the California Gold Rush town of Sonora, California in the Sierra Nevada foothills. His parents were of Italian ancestry from Switzerland. His grandmother, Anna Mouron, was the first female pharmacist in California. By the 1920s, the family had moved to the Central Valley city of Stockton, California, where Belli attended the now-defunct Stockton High School.

Belli graduated from the University of California, Berkeley in 1929. After traveling around the world, he returned to Berkeley and received his law degree from the institution in 1933.

Career
Following his admission to the California bar, his first job was posing as a hobo for the Works Progress Administration and riding the rails to observe the Depression's impact on the country's vagrant population. His first major legal victory came shortly after graduation, in a personal injury lawsuit representing an injured cable car gripman. Over insurance lawyers' objections, Belli brought a model of a cable car intersection, and the gear box and chain involved in the accident, to demonstrate to jurors exactly what had happened.

Besides his personal injury cases, which earned for him his byname "King of Torts," Belli was instrumental in setting up some of the foundations of modern consumer rights law, arguing several cases in the 1940s and 1950s that formed the basis for later lawsuits and landmark litigation by such figures as Ralph Nader. Belli argued (in cases such as Escola v. Coca-Cola Bottling Co., in 1944, which arose from an incident in which a restaurant waitress from Merced, California was injured by an exploding Coca-Cola bottle) that all products have an implied warranty, that it is to be foreseen that products will be used by a long chain of people, not just the direct recipient of the manufactured product, and that negligence by a defendant need not be proven if the defendant's product is defective.

In his book Ready for the Plaintiff, Belli noted examples of negligence cited by himself and other personal-injury lawyers to win in court—for example, a colleague in Florida, who showed how a builder violated a building code in Miami Beach concerning the use of wooden shims in construction of outside walls (forbidden by the municipal code because of the effect of the ocean salt and air). The facing was a slab of vitreous marble, whose adhesion was weakened by the climate; it fell off the side of the building and injured a passerby, who sued the builder. After winning a court case, Belli would raise a Jolly Roger flag over his office building in the Barbary Coast district of San Francisco (which Belli claimed had been a Gold Rush-era brothel) and fire a cannon, mounted on his office roof, to announce the victory and the impending party.

In his best-known case, Belli represented Jack Ruby, for free, after Ruby shot and killed Lee Harvey Oswald. Belli attempted to prove that Ruby was legally insane and had a history of mental illness in his family. On Saturday, March 14, 1964, Ruby was convicted of "murder with malice", and received a death sentence. Immediately thereafter, Ruby and his siblings fired Belli as they also hired and fired several other lawyers during the case. In late 1966, Ruby's conviction was overturned with help from other defense lawyers on the grounds that he did not receive a fair trial. A retrial was scheduled outside of Dallas, but Ruby died of cancer before it could take place. Belli became very critical of FBI Director J. Edgar Hoover.

In 1969 a man called San Francisco police, identifying himself as the serial killer known only as The Zodiac, and agreed to call talk show host Jim Dunbar on Dunbar's morning television talk show A.M. San Francisco if either Belli or attorney F. Lee Bailey were present on air. The police contacted Belli and Dunbar to arrange this in the hopes of capturing the individual. As promised, the suspect called, spoke a few words, and then hung up, repeating this activity 54 times over the next two hours. Belli received a letter from the Zodiac that same year.

Belli's firm filed for bankruptcy protection in December 1995. Belli was representing 800 women in a class action lawsuit against breast implant manufacturer Dow Corning. Belli won the lawsuit, but when Dow Corning declared bankruptcy, Belli had no way to recover the $5 million his firm had advanced to doctors and expert witnesses.

In the 1960s, Belli was among the leading members of the California plaintiffs bar who helped establish the California Trial Lawyers Association, which in the mid-1990s was renamed the Consumer Attorneys of California. The organization was established to help set standards and foment on-going legal education to help consumers have a better chance in court against the powerful legal teams amassed by the insurance companies and big corporations that typically were the defendants in accident, personal injury and other consumer lawsuits.

In media
Belli executive produced Tokyo File 212 (1951), Hollywood's first film to be shot entirely in Japan. It featured Florence Marly and Robert Peyton in key roles.

Belli enjoyed his frequent television and movie appearances; in 1965, he told Alex Haley, interviewing him for Playboy, that he "might have been an actor" if he had not become an attorney.

Belli appeared in "And the Children Shall Lead", a 1968  episode of the original Star Trek series. In it he appears as "Gorgan, the Friendly Angel", an evil being who corrupts a group of children, one of whom was played by his son Caesar.

He appeared in the Albert and David Maysles documentary Gimme Shelter (1970), which featured his representation and facilitation of The Rolling Stones' staging of the disastrous December 6, 1969, Altamont Free Concert.

In 1986 he played a criminal defense lawyer in an episode of the TV series Hunter titled "True Confessions".

In 1996 Belli recited the oratory to David Woodard's brass fanfare setting of Mark Twain's "The War Prayer" at Old First Church in San Francisco.

Belli was played by Brian Cox in the 2007 film Zodiac in the scene that depicted Belli's conversation with the Zodiac suspect on A.M. San Francisco.

Big Black guitarist Santiago Durango used Belli's name as a pseudonym in the credits of the last Big Black studio album, Songs About Fucking, as a nod to the fact that Durango was going to attend law school after Big Black disbanded.

Author
Belli was the author of several books, including the six-volume Modern Trials (written between 1954 and 1960) which has become a classic textbook on the demonstrative method of presenting evidence. Belli's unprecedented — and some thought undignified  — use of graphic evidence and expert witnesses later became common courtroom practice. His autobiography My Life on Trial is an account of his life and the noteworthy events he was involved in during his career. He also wrote the introduction to 847.0 The Whiplash Injury by L. Ted Frigard, D.C. published in 1970. Dr. Frigard had helped Belli with his pain through chiropractic care.

Personal life
Belli was married six times and divorced five. His marriage to his fifth wife, the former Lia Georgia Triff, ended with a scandalous and acrimonious divorce proceeding in 1991. Belli accused his ex-wife of having an affair with archbishop Desmond Tutu and of throwing one of his dogs off the Golden Gate Bridge. He was fined $1,000 for repeatedly calling her "El Trampo". At one point, Belli was ejected from the courtroom after accusing the judge of sleeping with his former wife's lawyer.  He was ultimately compelled to pay her an estimated $15 million. She later married Romanian prince Prince Paul of Romania. Belli married his sixth wife, Nancy Ho, on March 29, 1996. His youngest child, Melia, from fifth wife Lia, became an art history scholar, and is currently an assistant professor of Asian art history at the University of Texas at Arlington.

Death
Belli died of complications from pancreatic cancer at his home in San Francisco on July 9, 1996, aged 88. His death came suddenly, and in the presence of his wife Nancy. The New York Times''' quoted his publicist Edward Lozzi: "He was sitting; he just stopped breathing". At the time of his death, he had three sons, three daughters, twelve grandchildren, and two dogs. He is buried in Odd Fellows Cemetery in Sonora, California, his birthplace.

Bibliography
 1950, The Voice of Modern Trials 1951, The Adequate Award 1952, The More Adequate Award 1952, The More Adequate Award and the Flying Saucers 1954, Modern Trials (6 volumes)
 1955, The Use of Demonstrative Evidence in Achieving the More Adequate Award 1955, Medical Malpractice 1956, Blood Money Ready for the Plaintiff 1956, Ready for the Plaintiff: A Story of Personal Injury Law 1959, Modern Damages (6 volumes)
 1960, Belli Looks at Life and Law in Japan 1963, Belli Looks at Life and Law in Russia 1964, Dallas Justice: The Real Story of Jack Ruby And His Trial 1967, Trial Tactics 1968, Criminal Law 1968, The Law Revolt: A Summary of Trends in Modern Criminal and Civil Law 1968, The Law Revolution 1971, Angela: A Revealing Close-Up of the Woman And the Trial 1976, My Life on Trial: An Autobiography 1983, The Belli Files 1986, Everybody's Guide to the Law (co-author Allen P. Wilkinson)

Filmography (as actor)
 1968, Star Trek (as Gorgan in the episode "And the Children Shall Lead")
 1968, Wild in the Streets (as himself)
 1970, Gimme Shelter (as himself)
 1972, Arnie (TV Series, as Jonathan Berrenger, lawyer)
 1973, Ground Zero (a.k.a. The Golden Gate Is Ground Zero)
 1978, Lady of the House (TV, as Mayor Jim of San Francisco)
 1979, Whodunnit? (TV series, as himself)
 1984, Guilty or Innocent (TV series, as himself)
 1988, Hunter (TV series, as himself in the episode "True Confessions")
 1991, Murder, She Wrote (TV series, as Judge Harley in the episode "From the Horse's Mouth")
 2000, American Justice, "Divorce Wars" (TV series)

References

Bibliography
 Melvin Belli, King of the Courtroom'' by Mark Shaw, Barricade Books, 2006

External links
 Finding Aid to the Melvin M. Belli papers, 1939-1989 (bulk 1955–1980) at The Bancroft Library
 1981 television interview on "SFO with Steve Jamison," KRON-TV in San Francisco, Calif.
 "Enter justice, in alligator boots and a polka-dot tie" (December 11, 1984)
 Belli's 1996 rendering of "The War Prayer" (mp3)

 FBI file on Melvin Belli

1907 births
1996 deaths
American legal writers
American people of Swiss-Italian descent
California lawyers
Deaths from cancer in California
Deaths from pancreatic cancer
People associated with the assassination of John F. Kennedy
People from Stockton, California
Lawyers from San Francisco
UC Berkeley School of Law alumni
Works Progress Administration workers
Trial lawyers